Dick Bestwick (August 18, 1930 – January 4, 2018) was an American football coach, scout, and college athletics administrator.  He served as the head football coach of the University of Virginia from 1976 to 1981, compiling a record of 16–49–1. A native of Grove City, Pennsylvania, he played college football at the University of North Carolina at Chapel Hill, graduating from the school in 1952. Bestwick received his Masters in Education from Pennsylvania State University. Prior to his tenure at Virginia, Bestwick spent 1954 to 1962 as a high school football coach at three different schools including his alma mater, Grove City High School, and 1967 to 1975 as an assistant coach at Georgia Institute of Technology.  Bestwick was hired as the head football coach at Marshall University in 1971 after the 1970 plane crash that took the lives of most of the university's football team and coaching staff.  He left the position after two days on the job and returned to Georgia Tech.

Scouting and administrative career
After his time at Virginia he became a national scout for the Dallas Cowboys of the National Football League (NFL) from 1982 to 1983, assistant athletic director at the University of Missouri from 1983 to 1985 and the executive director of the Peach Bowl from 1985 to 1986. He served as the assistant athletic director at University of Georgia from 1986 to 1988, athletic director at the University of South Carolina in 1988, returned to Georgia as associate athletic director in 1990, and finally retiring as a senior associate athletic director in 2000. He was the father of three children, with five grandchildren.

Honors and awards
Bestiwck was inducted into the Peach Bowl Hall of Fame in 2002.  The Dick Bestwick Award for the male athlete graduating with the highest GPA at the University of Georgia was named in his honor.

Death
Bestwick died on January 4, 2018, in Athens, Georgia after suffering from transverse myelitis.

Head coaching record

References

1930 births
2018 deaths
Dallas Cowboys scouts
Georgia Tech Yellow Jackets football coaches
Georgia Bulldogs and Lady Bulldogs
North Carolina Tar Heels football players
South Carolina Gamecocks athletic directors
University of Missouri staff
College football bowl executives
Penn State College of Education alumni
People from Grove City, Pennsylvania
Players of American football from Pennsylvania